Tetraneuris linearifolia is a North American species of plants in the sunflower family, known by the common name fineleaf fournerved daisy. It grows in the south-central United States (Kansas, Oklahoma, Texas, New Mexico) and northern Mexico (Coahuila, Nuevo León, Tamaulipas).

It forms a branching underground caudex sometimes producing as many as 10 above-ground stems. One plant can produce as many as 80 flower heads. Each head has 9–25 yellow ray flowers surrounding 50-200 yellow disc flowers.

References

External links
Photo of herbarium specimen collected in Nuevo León in 1984

linearifolia
Flora of Northeastern Mexico
Flora of the Great Plains (North America)
Flora of the United States
Flora of the South-Central United States
Plants described in 1836
Taxa named by Edward Lee Greene